Piney Creek is an unincorporated community located in Piney Creek Township, Alleghany County, North Carolina, United States .

History
The William Weaver House was listed on the National Register of Historic Places in 1976.

Demographics
Piney Creek's Zip Code Tabulation Area (Zip Code 28663) has a population of 580 as of the 2000 census.  The population is 51.2% male and 48.8% female.  About 98.8% of the population is white, 0.7% African-American, 3.8% Hispanic, and 0.5% of people are two or more races.

The median household income is $34,405 with 18.4% of the population living below the poverty line.

See also
 Piney Creek Township

References

 

Unincorporated communities in Alleghany County, North Carolina
Unincorporated communities in North Carolina